Mount Rose (formerly called Stout's Corner) is an unincorporated community located within Hopewell Township, in Mercer County, New Jersey, United States, situated at the corner of Carter Road (also called County Route 569 and Hopewell-Princeton Road), Pennington-Rocky Hill Road, and Cherry Valley Road. It is named for a local gardener.  The Mount Rose section of Rocky Hill Ridge through the community also takes its name from the gardener.  Richard Stout opened the first general store in the village around 1822 and in 1830, Josiah Cook and Reuben Savidge opened a second store.  The settlement was also later home to two shoe shops, a dressmaker, wheelwrights, a blacksmith, a harness shop, an agricultural implements warehouse, a post office and a steam sawmill.  In its heyday the community had about 20 houses.  Nathaniel Drake opened an applejack distillery in the village in the mid-19th century.  He made and sold peach brandy, apple cider and apple whiskey.  The Whiskey House (192 Pennington-Rocky Hill Road), the office building for the distillery and the only remaining Drake building in the village, is listed on the township, state and national registers of historic places.  The community's schoolhouse, a stone building east of the crossroads, was later replaced by a frame building on the southern end of the village that is a private residence today.  After 1880, Mount Rose began shrinking, due to the growth of nearby Hopewell.  It is planned that the Lawrence Hopewell Trail will go through the community.

References

External links

 

Hopewell Township, Mercer County, New Jersey
Populated places established in 1822
Unincorporated communities in Mercer County, New Jersey
Unincorporated communities in New Jersey
1822 establishments in New Jersey